

The Oberlin Trio was founded in 1982 by three faculty members of the Oberlin Conservatory: Stephen Clapp, violin; Andor Toth Jr., cello; and Joseph Schwartz, piano.  Now in its current configuration with pianist Haewon Song, violinist David Bowlin, and cellist Dmitry Kouzov, the group continues an Oberlin tradition.

Touring 

The Oberlin Trio  has toured across the United States and in South Korea with traditional repertoire and contemporary works alike, with recent concerts highlighting music by the American composer George Walker and Japanese composer Toru Takemitsu.

Former members 
In addition to the founding members, former members of the Trio include cellists Peter Rejto, Darrett Adkins, and Amir Eldan.

Discography 
 Leon Kirchner Piano Trio , performed by the Oberlin Trio
 20th century American Piano Trios 
 French Trios  - Maurice Ravel, Jean Baptiste Loeillet of Ghent, Claude Debussy
 Trios by Dmitri Shostakovich, Antonín Dvořák, and Joan Tower.  Oberlin Music, 2016.
 Trios by Franz Joseph Haydn. Naxos (upcoming in summer 2022).

References 

Piano trios
American classical music groups
Musical groups from Ohio
Oberlin College
University musical groups